Saunders is a surname of English and Scottish patronymic origin derived from Sander, a mediaeval form of Alexander.

People 

 Ab Saunders (1851–1883), American cowboy and gunman
 Al Saunders (born 1947), American football coach
 Alan Saunders (broadcaster) (1954–2012), broadcaster for the Australian Broadcasting Corporation
 Alan Saunders (police officer) (1886–1964), Inspector-General of Police in Palestine, 1937–1943
 Alan Saunders (public servant) (1892–1957), English public servant and cricketer
 Albert Charles Saunders (1874–1943), Canadian politician
 Alfred Saunders (1820–1905), New Zealand politician
 Alfred Thomas Saunders (1854–1940), generally known as A. T. Saunders, South Australian historian
 Alison Saunders (born 1961), British barrister and Director of Public Prosecutions
 Allen Saunders (1899–1986), American cartoonist
 Alvin Saunders (1817–1899), American politician
 Amy Saunders, British performer also known as Miss Behave
 Andrew Saunders (disambiguation):
 Andrew Saunders (1931–2009), British expert in artillery fortifications
Andy Saunders (author), English author and researcher
Andy Saunders (rugby league) (born 1994), Australian rugby league footballer
 Angela Saunders (born 1977), English model and actress
 Arthur Frederick Saunders (1879–1947), British soldier
 Ben Saunders (disambiguation):
 Ben Saunders (Australian footballer) (born 1991), Australian rules footballer
 Ben Saunders (English footballer) (born 1984), English footballer
 Ben Saunders (explorer) (born 1977), British polar explorer, endurance athlete, and motivational speaker
 Ben Saunders (fighter) (born 1983), professional mixed martial artist
 Ben Saunders (Holby City), a character in Holby City
 Ben Saunders (singer) (born 1983), Dutch winner of season 1 of The Voice of Holland
 Benjamin Saunders (professor) (born 1968), comics expert
 Bill Saunders (1898–1950), American college football coach
 Billy Saunders (born 1937), Canadian ice hockey player
 Billy Joe Saunders (born 1989), British boxer
 Bob Saunders (American football), American football coach
 Bob Saunders (baseball), baseball pitcher in the Negro leagues
 Bob Saunders (politician) (1929–2016), American politician
 Bonita Saunders, American mathematician specializing in mathematical visualization.
 Bradley Saunders (born 1986), English boxer
 Bud Saunders (born 1884), American football and basketball coach
 Charles Saunders (disambiguation):
Charles Saunders (Royal Navy officer) (1713–1775), British admiral
Charles Saunders (administrator) (died 1931), British administrator
Charles Saunders (tennis), real tennis world champion, 1890–1895
Charles Saunders (director) (1904–1997), English film director and screenwriter
Charles Saunders (rower) (1902–1994), New Zealand rower
Charles E. Saunders (1867–1937), Canadian agronomist
Charles H. Saunders (1821–1901), City Councilor, Alderman and Mayor of Cambridge, Massachusetts
Charles R. Saunders (born 1946), Canadian fantasy author
Charles Saunders (bishop) (1884–1973), Bishop of Lucknow, 1928–1938
 Chris Saunders (headmaster), English headmaster and cricketer
 Cicely Saunders, British physician
 Clarence Saunders (grocer), American retailer
 Clarence Saunders (athlete), Bermudian high jumper
 Dale Saunders (disambiguation):
 Dale Saunders (singer) Saint Kitts and Nevis-born London-based soca and fusion music singer
 Dale Saunders (soccer), Trinidad and Tobago football player
 E. Dale Saunders, American scholar
 Dave Saunders (volleyball) (born 1960), American volleyball player
 David Saunders (disambiguation):
 David Saunders, painter and sculptor, son of illustrator Norman Saunders
 David Saunders (American football player) (born 1976), American football player
 David Saunders (American football coach) (born 1958), at University of Louisiana-Lafayette
 David Saunders (ice hockey) (born 1966), Canadian ice hockey player
 David Saunders (political strategist), Democratic political strategist and author
 David J. Saunders (1811–1873), Virginia businessman and politician
 Dean Saunders, Welsh footballer
 Debra Saunders, American journalist
 Dero A. Saunders, American journalist
 Desmond Saunders (1926–2018), British television director
 Doug Saunders, Canadian journalist
 Drew P. Saunders, American politician
 Edith Rebecca Saunders, British biologist
 Edward Saunders (disambiguation):
Edward W. Saunders (1860–1921), Virginian politician
Edward Saunders (judge) (died 1576), British judge
Edward Saunders (entomologist) (1848–1910), British entomologist
Edward Saunders (MP) for Coventry (UK Parliament constituency)
 Emily Eliza Saunders (c. 1830–1875), English singer
 Ernest Saunders, British businessman
 Flip Saunders (1955–2015), American basketball coach
 Fred Saunders James Frederick Saunders (born 1951), American basketball player.
 Frederick Saunders, British writer, librarian, bookseller, and newspaper editor
 Frederick Albert Saunders (1875–1963), American spectroscopist
 Frederick Richard Saunders, Ceylonese colonial administrator
 G. K. Saunders (1910–2005), New Zealand radio and TV writer
 George Saunders (disambiguation):
 George Saunders, American short story writer and professor at Syracuse University
 George Saunders (athlete) (1907–1996), member of the English 4×110 yards relay team
 George Saunders (British wrestler), British Olympic wrestler
 George Saunders (Canadian wrestler) (born 1949), Canadian former wrestler
 George Saunders (footballer, born 1918) (1918–1982), English football player for Everton
 George Saunders (footballer, born 1989), English football player
 George Saunders (Royal Navy officer) (c. 1671–1734), naval officer, official and politician
 George Lethbridge Saunders (1807–1863), English painter
 Gloria Saunders, American actress
 Helen Saunders, British artist
 Harry Saunders (disambiguation):
 Harry Saunders Henry George Saunders (1898–1930), Australian rules footballer
 Harry Saunders, inspiration for Harry's War (1999 film)
 Harry Saunders (priest) (1913–1967), Archdeacon of Macclesfield
 Harry Saunders (economist), see Khazzoom–Brookes postulate
 Harold Saunders (disambiguation):
Harold Saunders (chess player) (1875–1950), British chess and bridge player
Harold E. Saunders (1890–1961), American hydrodynamicist
Harold H. Saunders (1930–2016), US Assistant Secretary of State for Near East Affairs
 Henry Saunders (disambiguation):
 Henry Saunders (cricketer, born 1883) (1883–1942), cricketer for Somerset
 Henry Saunders (cricketer, born 1966), cricketer with Turks and Caicos Islands
 Henry Saunders (politician) (1855–1919), Australian politician
 Hilary Saint George Saunders British soldier, writer and official historian
 Howard Saunders, British ornithologist
 Hugh Saunders, South African Royal Air Force commander
 Irene Saunders, American dictionary compiler
 J. J. Saunders, British historian
 Jack Saunders (disambiguation):
 Jack Saunders (Australian cricketer) (1876–1927), Australian cricketer
 Jack Saunders (Middlesex cricketer), English cricketer
 Jack Saunders (English footballer) (1924–2013), English (soccer) football centre half
 Jack Saunders (presenter), British TV and radio presenter
 Jake Saunders  (1917–2002), British banker in Hong Kong
 Jason Saunders, New Zealand sailor
 Jay Saunders, Big band lead trumpeter, collegiate jazz studies educator
 Jennifer Saunders (born 1958), British comedian and actress
 Jeraldine Saunders (1923–2019), American writer
Joe Saunders, American baseball pitcher
Joe Saunders (politician), member of the Florida House of Representatives
 John Saunders (disambiguation):
 John Saunders, pseudonym of British novelist Arthur Nickson (1902–1974)
 John Saunders (chess player) (born 1953), British writer and magazine editor
 John Saunders (English judge) (born 1949), English High Court Judge of the Queen's Bench Division
 John Saunders (footballer) (1950–1998), English professional footballer
 John Saunders (Home and Away), fictional character
 John Saunders (jockey), Epsom Derby winning jockey in the 19th century
 John Saunders (journalist) (1955–2016), Canadian-American sports journalist
 John Saunders (MP) (1590–1638), English member for Reading
 John Saunders (New Brunswick judge) (1754–1834), Canadian soldier and lawyer
 John Baker Saunders (1954–1999), bassist for the American group Mad Season
 John Cunningham Saunders (1773–1810), British ophthalmologist
 John Joseph Saunders (1910–1972), British medieval historian
 John Llewellyn Saunders (1891–1961), New Zealand dentist and public health administrator
 John Monk Saunders (1897–1940), American novelist, screenwriter and movie director
 John Poyntz Saunders, killed by Bhagat Singh and Shivaram Rajguru, Indian revolutionaries
 John R. Saunders (1869–1934), American lawyer and politician in Virginia
 Jonny Saunders, an English radio presenter and schoolteacher
Joseph Saunders (disambiguation)
 Joseph Saunders (chief executive), CEO of Visa Inc.
 Joseph Saunders (engraver), English print-maker and Fine Art professor
 Kate Saunders, British journalist
 Khalen Saunders (born 1996), American football player
 Laurence Saunders, British preacher of the sixteenth century
 Leslie Saunders, Canadian mayor
 Margaret Marshall Saunders, Canadian writer
 Matt Saunders (disambiguation), several people, including
 Matt Saunders (artist) (born 1975), American contemporary artist
 Matt Saunders (rugby union, born 1988), with the Philippines national rugby union team
 Matt Saunders (rugby union, born 1982), with Southland and Highlanders Super Rugby
 Matthew Saunders, English footballer
 Matthew J. Saunders, English composer
 Melva Saunders, Australian basketball player
 Merl Saunders, American musician
 Michael Saunders (disambiguation):
 Michael Saunders (born 1986), Canadian baseball player
 Michael Saunders (academic) (born 1944), American numerical analyst and computer scientist
 Michael Saunders (economist), Bank of England Monetary Policy Committee member
 Michael Graham Saunders (1920–1975), neurophysiologist
 Mike Saunders (born 1952), rock critic and singer
 Mike Saunders (Canadian football) (born 1969), former Canadian Football League running back
 Mike Saunders (soccer) (born 1972), retired Jamaican soccer player
 Neil Saunders (born 1983), English footballer
 Nicholas Saunders (Vice-Chancellor) of the University of Newcastle
 Nicholas Saunders (activist), British entrepreneur and MDMA advocate
 Nicholas J. Saunders (born 1953), British academic archaeologist and anthropologist 
 Nigella Saunders, Jamaican badminton player
 Norman Saunders, American illustrator
 Norman Saunders (politician), politician from the Turks and Caicos Islands
 Oliver Saunders, jazz pianist
 Owen Saunders, British scientist and engineer
 Pamela Saunders, American model
 Pete Saunders (born 1960), musician
 Peter Saunders (disambiguation)
 Peter Gordon Saunders, Australian social researcher
 Peter Robert Saunders, British social researcher
 Peter Saunders (impresario) (1911–2003), English theatre impresario
 Philip Saunders (cricketer), Australian cricketer, playing mostly in England
 Philip Saunders (philatelist), (1899 – 1975), British banker and philatelist
 Rachel Saunders, American beauty queen
 Raven Saunders (born 1996), American track and field athlete
 Raymond Saunders (disambiguation):
Raymond Saunders (artist) 
Raymond Saunders (clockmaker)
 Rebecca Saunders, composer
 Reg Saunders (1920–1990), Australian army officer
 Richard Saunders (disambiguation)
 Richard Saunders, a pseudonym of Benjamin Franklin (1706–1790) 
Richard Saunders (anatomist) (1908–1995), South African anatomist
Richard Saunders (photographer) (1922–1987), American photographer
Richard Saunders (skeptic) (born 1965), Australian skeptic 
 Rob Saunders (born 1968), Irish rugby union player
 Robert Saunders (disambiguation)
 Robert Saunders (Irish lawyer) (c. 1650–1708), Serjeant-at-law
 Robert Saunders Jr. (1805–1868), American academic and politician
 Robert Alan Saunders, American computer scientist and professor
 Robert Hood Saunders (1903–1955), mayor of Toronto
 Romulus Mitchell Saunders, North Carolina politician
 Ron Saunders, English football player and manager
 Ryan Saunders, American basketball coach
 Stephen Saunders (military attache), British military attache based in Greece
 Thomas Saunders (disambiguation):
Thomas Saunders (academic), Vice-Chancellor of Oxford University
Thomas Saunders (colonel), co-author of the Petition of the three colonels of 1654
Thomas Saunders (born 1593), English MP for Buckinghamshire
Thomas Saunders (born 1626) (1626–1670), English MP for Wallingford
Thomas Saunders (born 1641), English MP for Milborne Port (UK Parliament constituency)
Thomas Saunders (died 1565) (1513–1565), English MP for Gatton, Reigate and Surrey
Thomas Saunders (governor) (1713–1775), British governor of Madras from 1750 till 1755
Thomas Saunders (MP for Coventry), English MP for Coventry
Thomas Saunders (MP for Devon), English MP for Devon, 1653–1659
Thomas A. Saunders III (born 1937), American investment banker and philanthropist
Thomas E. Saunders (born 1951), member of the Indiana House of Representatives
Thomas Harry Saunders (1813–1870), known as T. H. Saunders, British paper-maker
Thomas William Saunders (1814–1890), British metropolitan police magistrate
 Tobias Saunders, Deputy to the Rhode Island General Assembly
 Tom Saunders (1921–2001), football coach
 Tony Saunders, American baseball player
 Turner Saunders, American Methodist preacher
 Weslye Saunders, American football player
 Wilfred Saunders, British librarian and academic
 William Saunders (disambiguation): 
 William Saunders (botanist) (1822–1900), American botanist and architect
 William Saunders (builder) (1767–1861), American architect
 William Saunders (died 1570), MP for Gatton and Surrey
 William Saunders (footballer) (fl. 1900), football goalkeeper for Burslem Port Vale
 William Saunders (Liberal politician) (1823–1895), British newspaper publisher
^* William Saunders (photographer) (1832–1892), British photographer
 William Saunders (physician) (1743–1817), Scottish physician
 William Saunders (poet) (1806–1851), Welsh poet writing in Welsh
 William Saunders (scientist) (1836–1914), Canadian pharmacist, entomologist, and plant breeder
 William B. Saunders (1896–1977), American football, basketball, and baseball coach
 William Edwin Saunders (1861–1943), Canadian naturalist
 William Gualbert Saunders (1837–1923), English designer of stained glass
 William L. Saunders (1835–1891), colonel in the U.S. Civil War and North Carolina secretary of state
 William Lawrence Saunders (1856–1931), American mining engineer and chairman of Ingersoll Rand
 William Penman Saunders (1912–1980), business manager and politician in Newfoundland, Canada
 William Wilson Saunders (1809–1879), British entomologist

Fictional characters 
 Campbell Saunders, in Degrassi
 Daniel (Danny) Saunders, in Chaim Potok's The Chosen and The Promise
 Finbarr Saunders, in Viz
 Grace Saunders, in the Alone in the Dark series
 Matthew "Matt" Saunders, in My Super Ex-Girlfriend
 Reb Isaac Saunders, in Chaim Potok's The Chosen and The Promise
 Saunders, a Jewel thief in the film Short Circuit 2
 Saunders, a fellow MI6 agent in the James Bond film The Living Daylights
 Speed Saunders, in DC Comics
 Stephen Saunders (24 character), in 24
 Tommy Saunders, a Boston Police Department Sergeant, in Patriots Day

Places
 Saunders, Kansas, a ghost town, United States
 Saunders, Stanton County, Kansas, an unincorporated community, United States
 Saunders County, Nebraska, United States
 Saunders, Wisconsin, United States
 Saunderstown, Rhode Island, a village in the United States 
 Saunders Island, South Sandwich Islands, an uninhabited island

References

See also
 Saunders Mac Lane (1909–2005), American mathematician
 Saunders-Roe, a British aero and marine-engineering company
 Saunders (imprint), a publishing brand of Elsevier
 Saunders Secondary School, a school in London, Ontario, Canada
 Saundersfoot, a large village in Pembrokeshire, Wales

English-language surnames
Patronymic surnames
Surnames from given names